The 2015–16 Nashville Predators season was the 18th season for the National Hockey League franchise that was established on June 25, 1997. It was also the first time that the Predators played in a game 7 in a playoff series.

Schedule and results

Pre-season

Regular season

Playoffs

Summary

First round: Anaheim
After trailing 2-1 in the second period, the Predators opened their playoff run with a 3-2 victory over the Ducks. The Predators took a 2-0 lead in the series with a 3-2 victory over the Ducks. Back home in Nashville for Game 3, the Predators were shut out in a 3-0 loss and the Ducks pushed the series to 2-1. The Ducks evened the series in a 4-1 victory in Game 4. The Ducks pulled to a one-game lead over the Predators with a 5-2 victory in Game 5. Back in Nashville for Game 6, the Predators kept the series alive with a 3-1 victory over the Ducks. The Predators scored two goals in the first period and held off a late rally by the Ducks to win Game 7 2-1 and advance on to the Western Conference semifinals.

Second round: San Jose
Despite scoring the first goal, the Predators fell 5-2 to the Sharks in Game 1 of the second round. The Predators fell to a two-game deficit in a 3-2 loss to the Sharks in Game 2. After allowing a power play goal in the first period, the Predators scored four unanswered goals – including two on power plays – to take Game 3. A third overtime goal by Mike Fisher gave the Predators a 4-3 victory in Game 4 and evened the series at two games a piece. The Predators fell 5-1 to the Sharks in Game 5. Despite trailing two goals in the first period of Game 6, the Predators rallied back to tie the game in the third period and score the winning goal in overtime to force a Game 7, which they lost 5–0.

Results

Player stats
Final stats

Skaters

Goaltenders

†Denotes player spent time with another team before joining the Predators. Stats reflect time with the Predators only.
‡Traded mid-season. Stats reflect time with the Predators only.
Bold/italics denotes franchise record

Awards and honours

Awards

Milestones

Transactions 

The Predators have been involved in the following transactions during the 2015–16 season.

Trades

Free agents acquired

Free agents lost

Claimed via waivers

Lost via waivers

Player signings

Draft picks

Below are the Nashville Predators' selections at the 2015 NHL Entry Draft, that was held on June 26–27, 2015 at the BB&T Center in Sunrise, Florida.

Draft notes

 The Nashville Predators' first-round pick was traded to the Toronto Maple Leafs (later sent Philadelphia) as the result of a trade on February 15, 2015, that sent Cody Franson and Mike Santorelli to Nashville in exchange for Olli Jokinen, Brendan Leipsic and this pick.
 The San Jose Sharks' fourth-round pick went to the Nashville Predators as the result of a trade on June 28, 2014, that sent Detroit's second-round pick in 2014 to San Jose in exchange for a second-round pick in 2014 and this pick.

References

Nashville Predators seasons
Nashville Predators season, 2015-16
Nashville Predators
National Hockey League All-Star Game hosts